Daniel Heløy Davidsen (born 30 December 1978 in Copenhagen) is a Danish-Norwegian guitarist. He is known for his participation in bands like Czesław Śpiewa and JazzKamikaze and many record appearances as a studio musician, with artists like Selena Gomez and Kylie Minogue.

Career 
Daniel Davidsen was born in Denmark to Norwegian parents. He was educated at Copenhagen Rhythmic Music Conservatory and has experience in a wide variety of genres, from rock/pop to country, hardcore fusion, hip-hop, Balkan, world music and jazz. He has mainly played as a session musician for such as Nexus (Nik & Jay and others), Tue West (both record album and live), Tescu Value, Bombay Rockers and the Joker. Regardless of the genre, Davidsen always adds to the music his personal trademark, an exquisite melody and presence in all tones. His success as a musician reached great heights as part of the band JazzKamikaze with appearances at Kongsberg Jazzfestival and Moldejazz and internationally at North Sea Jazz Festival, Bangkok Jazz Festival, Rochester Jazz Festival as well as being part of the opening of the annual Rio Carnival in Rio de Janeiro.

Discography 
As part of JazzKamikaze
 2005: Mission I, (Stunt)
 2007: Travelling at the speed of sound, (Stunt)
 2008: Emergin pilots EP, (SevenSeas)
 2009: The revolution's in your hands EP, (SevenSeas)
 2010: Supersonic revolutions, (SevenSeas)
 2012: The Return of JazzKamikaze (Stunt)

Songwriting and production credits

References

External links 
 of JazzKamikaze

1978 births
Living people
Musicians from Copenhagen
Norwegian jazz guitarists
Danish jazz guitarists
Norwegian jazz composers
Male jazz composers
Danish jazz composers
Danish people of Norwegian descent
21st-century Norwegian guitarists
21st-century Norwegian male musicians
JazzKamikaze members